Agriocnemis minima is a species of damselfly in the family Coenagrionidae. It is distributed across Indochina and can be found in Cambodia, Thailand and Singapore.
It breeds in marshes and wet habitats.

References

Coenagrionidae